Wang Xun (Chinese name: 王珣; 349–400) was a Chinese calligrapher , who lived during the Jin Dynasty (266–420). Wang Xun was the "Sage of Calligraphy" Wang Xizhi (王羲之)’s nephew, Wang Xianzhi (王献之)’s cousin.

His most famous work is a letter written to his friend Boyuan (伯远), called A letter to Boyuan, one of the Three Rarities of Calligraphy(三希).

349 births
400 deaths
Jin dynasty (266–420) calligraphers
4th-century Chinese calligraphers